Gregory Westlake (born 12 June 1986) is a Canadian ice sledge hockey player.

Early life and career
Both his legs were amputated when he was 18 months old; because of a congenital defect he had no tibia in one leg, and no fibula in the other. At age six he appeared in a public service announcement for The War Amps non-profit organization on playing safe, and is still close to the organization that provides support and services to all Canadian amputees.

He began to play ice sledge hockey in 2001 at age 15, for the Mississauga Cruisers, then made his debut for the Canadian national team in 2003, eventually becoming captain of the team. He has won medals at the 2006 Winter Paralympics and 2014 Winter Paralympics. An accomplished golfer, he regularly competes in local club championships in his hometown and both introduced his older brother to the game and taught him how to play.

Honours

 2013 IPC Ice Sledge Hockey World Championships
 Gold (Greg was named forward of the tournament)
 2014 Winter Paralympics
 Bronze medal
 2010 Winter Paralympics
 4th place in ice sledge hockey
 2009 IPC Ice Sledge Hockey World Championships
 Bronze
 2008 IPC Ice Sledge Hockey World Championships
 Gold (Greg scored the winning goal, 8 seconds from the end)
 2006 Winter Paralympics
 Gold in ice sledge hockey
 2004 IPC Ice Sledge Hockey World Championships
 4th place

References

External links
 
 
 Profile at the Canadian Paralympic Committee
 Profile at Hockey Canada
 Profile at Vancouver 2010

1986 births
Living people
Canadian sledge hockey players
Paralympic sledge hockey players of Canada
Paralympic gold medalists for Canada
Ice sledge hockey players at the 2006 Winter Paralympics
Ice sledge hockey players at the 2010 Winter Paralympics
Ice sledge hockey players at the 2014 Winter Paralympics
Para ice hockey players at the 2018 Winter Paralympics
Para ice hockey players at the 2022 Winter Paralympics
Medalists at the 2006 Winter Paralympics
Medalists at the 2014 Winter Paralympics
Medalists at the 2018 Winter Paralympics
Medalists at the 2022 Winter Paralympics
Paralympic medalists in sledge hockey